This is a list of the Italy national football team results from 1990 to 2009. During this period, Italy achieved first place at the 2006 FIFA World Cup, second place at the 1994 World Cup and at UEFA Euro 2000, third place at the 1990 World Cup and the bronze medal at the 2004 Olympic football tournament.

Results

1990

1991

1992

1993

1994

1995

1996

1997

1998

1999

2000

2001

2002

2003

2004

2005

2006

2007

2008

2009

1Indicates new coach

External links
Italy – International Matches 1990–1999 on RSSSF.com
Italy – International Matches 2000–2009 on RSSSF.com

1990s in Italy
2000s in Italy
Italy national football team results